The Cabinet Secretary for Health and Social Care, commonly referred to as the Health Secretary, is a cabinet position in the Scottish Government. The Cabinet Secretary is responsible for the Health and Social Care Directorates and NHS Scotland.

The Cabinet Secretary is assisted by the Minister for Public Health, Women's Health and Sport, Maree Todd and Minister for Mental Wellbeing and Social Care, Kevin Stewart.

The current Cabinet Secretary is Humza Yousaf, who was appointed in May 2021.

History
The position was created in 1999 as the Minister for Health and Community Care, with the advent of devolution and the institution of the Scottish Parliament, taking over some of the roles and functions of the former Scottish Office that existed prior to 1999. After the 2007 election the Ministerial position was renamed to the Cabinet Secretary for Health and Wellbeing.

After the 2011 election the full Ministerial title was Cabinet Secretary for Health, Wellbeing and Cities Strategy with the portfolio being expanded to include Cities Strategy which was part of the SNP manifesto to have a dedicated "Minister for Cities"; at the same time the responsibility for housing was removed and transferred to the new Cabinet Secretary for Infrastructure and Capital Investment. Responsibilities for the cities strategy and the delivery of the 2014 Commonwealth Games in Glasgow were later transferred to other members of the cabinet.

After the 2016 election, the name of the post was changed to simply Cabinet Secretary for Health and Sport. In the 2021 cabinet reshuffle, the post was retitled to Cabinet Secretary for Health and Social Care.

Overview

Responsibilities
The responsibilities of the Cabinet Secretary for Health and Social Care include:
NHS Scotland and its performance, staff and pay
health care and social integration
patient services and patient safety
primary care
allied Healthcare services
carers, adult care and support
child and maternal health
medical records, health improvement and protection

Public bodies
The following public bodies report to the Cabinet Secretary for Health and Social Care:
 NHS Scotland
 Care Inspectorate
 Mental Welfare Commission for Scotland
 Scottish Social Services Council
 Sportscotland

List of office holders

References

External links 
Cabinet Secretary for Health and Sport on Scottish Government website

 
Cabinet Secretary posts of the Scottish Government